Evil Water and Other Stories is a collection by Ian Watson published in 1987.

Plot summary
Evil Water and Other Stories is a collection of 10 science fiction, fantasy, and horror stories.

Reception
Dave Langford reviewed Evil Water for White Dwarf #88, and stated that "This collection is a shade less substantial than previous ones, but still offers fun and intellectual fireworks: alien parasites, failed timegates, transatlantic sponsored swimming, Greenham Common allegory, and an enjoyably nasty sense of humour throughout."

Reviews
Review by David V. Barrett (1987) in Vector 138
Review by L. J. Hurst (1987) in Vector 138
Review by Lee Montgomerie (1987) in Interzone, #21 Autumn 1987
Review by Gregory Feeley (1987) in Foundation, #40 Summer 1987

References

1987 short story collections
British science fiction books
British short story collections
Speculative fiction short story collections